Terius Gray (born March 26, 1975), better known by his stage name Juvenile, is an American rapper best known for his work with Birdman's Cash Money Records in the late 1990s and early 2000s, both solo and as a member of the label's then-flagship group, Hot Boys.

Juvenile's career began in the early 1990s as a teenager with bounce music recordings that made him a local star. He released his debut album Being Myself in 1995. After signing to Cash Money, Juvenile released Solja Rags in 1997, which included the major local hit "Solja Rag". A year later, he released the multi-platinum 400 Degreez, which included his first nationwide hits "Ha" and "Back That Azz Up" (featuring Mannie Fresh and Lil Wayne). He released other successful solo albums for Cash Money: Tha G-Code (1999), Project English (2001) and Juve the Great (2003), which included the number-one hit "Slow Motion" (featuring Soulja Slim). After leaving Cash Money, Juvenile has released several other albums, including The Beginning of the End (2004) with group UTP, which included the anthem "Nolia Clap" and the solo number-one album Reality Check (2006).

Career

1994–1997: Beginnings, Being Myself and Solja Rags 
Juvenile was raised in the Magnolia Projects of Uptown New Orleans, Louisiana's 3rd Ward and attended Our Lady of Grace Catholic School. He first began recording his raps in the early 1990s.

Juvenile's debut album, Being Myself, was released in 1995 after signing with Warlock Records. The album did not gain much national attention and did not chart, but did fairly well on a local level.

After the regional success of his debut Juvenile signed to the larger Cash Money Records. In 1997 Solja Rags, Juvenile's debut album with Cash Money Records, was released. It became popular among local rap audiences, and also saw some national success as it charted on the Billboard Hot R&B/Hip-Hop Songs chart. It was the first time he worked with Cash Money in-house producer Mannie Fresh, who would go on to produce all of Juvenile's albums on Cash Money in their entirety except Juve the Great. Also in 1997, Juvenile joined the Hot Boys with fellow Cash Money rappers B.G., Turk, and Lil Wayne. They released their debut album as a group, titled Get It How U Live!.

1998–2002: 400 Degreez, Tha G-Code and Project English 
Juvenile's next album, titled 400 Degreez, was released in 1998. It was his breakout to the national rap scene. The Cash Money label now had joint distribution by Universal Records, which gave the music much more national promotion. This along with much more critically praised music made Juvenile a mainstream star. The album's first single "Ha" and later "Back That Azz Up" both became very successful songs charting on the Billboard Hot 100 and the Hot R&B/Hip-Hop Songs chart. Powered by these two singles, 400 Degreez was eventually certified 4× platinum by the RIAA. It is his best selling album to date. However, there came a dispute over who owned the rights to the title of "Back That Azz Up", as another New Orleans performer DJ Jubilee claimed that Juvenile's song sounded very similar to a song of his. In January 2005, the United States Court of Appeals for the Fifth Circuit in New Orleans denied the case.

In 1998, capitalizing off Juvenile's popularity off 400 Degreez, a remixed version of Being Myself and reissue of Solja Rags were released. The second Hot Boys group album, Guerrilla Warfare also came out and was successful, being certified Platinum. Over the next few years Juvenile released two more solo albums for Cash Money: Tha G-Code in 1999 being certified Double Platinum, and Project English in 2001 being certified Platinum. These albums each were very successful as they both reached the top 10 of the Billboard Hot 200, but they did not match the success of 400 Degreez. UTP Records had promised an album titled 600 Degreez but it never materialized.

2003–2006: Juve the Great and Reality Check 
Juvenile's manager Aubrey Francis and Cash Money's Baby met and worked out a deal for Juve and CMR to partner for another album. Juvenile returned to Cash Money Records in 2003, releasing Juve the Great. Juve The Great was certified Platinum; it featured the number-one hit "Slow Motion" featuring Soulja Slim. It was the only number-one hit for Juvenile and Slim before Slim died in November 2003. The last Hot Boys album Let 'Em Burn came out in 2003.

In 2005 Juvenile signed a new deal with Atlantic Records for himself, and also a separate label deal for his UTP Records imprint. UTP Records is the label that was started by Juve along with his longtime manager Aubrey "Pied Piper" Francis, and older brother Corey. The group called "UTP" (Juve, Skip, and Wacko) released the hit song "Nolia Clap" as part of UTP Records first album release. It was produced by Juve along with producer XL Robertson. Atlantic Records. Juvenile also performed the song "Booty Language". It was part of the soundtrack for the movie Hustle And Flow. Juve performed alongside fellow Atlantic artist at the movies premier party in West Hollywood, California. Juvenile's Slidell, Louisiana home was damaged during Hurricane Katrina. Juvenile and fellow New Orleans rapper Master P and other hip hop artists raised funds and supplies for some hurricane victims. He moved to Atlanta briefly after Hurricane Katrina in 2005. In Spring 2006 he returned home to New Orleans.

Reality Check, Juvenile's 2006 album, debuted at number one on the Billboard 200 chart, being his first number-one album. It was certified Gold. Production began in May 2005, most of it being done at a Holiday Inn hotel room in New Orleans. Its first single was "Animal", followed by "Rodeo", "Get Ya Hustle On" produced by Donald XL Robertson, "What's Happenin'" Produced by Terrence "Sinista" Freeman, and "Way I Be Leanin'" featuring Mike Jones, Paul Wall, Skip, and Wacko. A portion of the album was recorded with engineer, Stewart Cararas at his studio Paradigm Park Studios in New Orleans. Within one month, the studio suffered the wrath of Hurricane Katrina. Stewart now lives and operates in Los Angeles. On signing to Atlantic, Juvenile criticized his former label Cash Money for not giving him enough creative freedoms as well as Federal Emergency Management Agency over his perceptions over their handling of Hurricane Katrina. Shaheem Reid noted "Get Ya Hustle On" as a criticism of Ray Nagin's and the George W. Bush administration's handling of the whole Hurricane Katrina Disaster.

2007–2013: Cocky & Confident, Beast Mode and Rejuvenation 
In a 2009 interview with Allhiphop.com writer Han O'Connor, Juvenile stated that his album Cocky & Confident would take a totally different direction from his last project, which was made when he was still "mourning Katrina." He also revealed that he decided to work only with fresh, young producers on the album and discussed his respect for younger artists like Soulja Boy.

Cocky & Confident was released in December 2009. It peaked at #49 on the Billboard 200. It was Juvenile's lowest charting album since 1997. It featured one charting single, "Gotta Get It", which peaked at #53 on the Billboard R&B/Hip-Hop Singles chart. Following this album's release Juvenile began work on his next album, Beast Mode. This album was released in July 2010. Its first single is titled "Drop That Thang".

Juvenile released his tenth studio album Rejuvenation on June 19, 2012, which was distributed by Rap-A-Lot Records.

The first single from the album is "Power" featuring Rick Ross. Juvenile collaborated with Lil Wayne, DJ Khaled, and Drake for the album.

2014–present: The Fundamentals and Cash Money Reunion 
On February 18, 2014, Juvenile released his eleventh studio album The Fundamentals. On October 28, 2014, Juvenile announced and confirmed that he re-signed to Cash Money. On March 28, 2019, both Juvenile and Birdman released a joint album called Just Another Gangsta.

In April 2021, Juvenile was awarded a key to the city of New Orleans by mayor LaToya Cantrell.

Personal life 
Juvenile had a daughter, Jelani, with Joy Deleston. On February 29, 2008, 4-year-old Jelani was shot and killed in her home, along with mother Deleston and older half sister. It was reported that Deleston's oldest child, 17-year-old son Anthony Tyrone Terrell Jr., returned to the home after police arrived and implicated himself in the murder of his mother and siblings. Terrell was charged with three counts of murder and three counts of aggravated assault. He remains in the DeKalb County jail. Though Juvenile received some criticism for not attending the funeral for his daughter and her mother, several statements were released that the rapper was "shocked and devastated" by the event. The rapper stated that he made the decision not to appear at the funeral to prevent subsequent media attention, and was concerned that it would divert attention away from the ceremony. Terrell was given two consecutive life sentences after pleading guilty to killing Joy Deleston, 39, and her daughters, Micaiah, 11, and Jelani. Due to his age, he could not be sentenced to death in Georgia.

He endorsed Tom Steyer in the 2020 United States presidential election. A video of him dancing with Steyer to his hit song "Back That Azz Up" went viral on the internet shortly before the 2020 South Carolina Democratic primary was held.

Legal troubles 
In the summer of 2002, Juvenile was arrested for assaulting his barber over charges that the barber was bootlegging his music.

In January 2003, Juvenile was arrested in New Orleans on drug charges. The next month, he was sentenced to 75 hours of community service for a fight outside a nightclub in Miami, Florida in 2001.

Juvenile was involved in a legal dispute over failure to pay child support for his daughter Jelani with Joy Deleston, a deputy sheriff in Gwinnett County, Georgia. A paternity lawsuit was issued by Deleston in 2004, resulting in a DNA test and both parties agreeing that Juvenile was Jelani's father. His attorney stated that the case was resolved peacefully by consent order in 2006.

On February 25, 2010, Juvenile was arrested in Arabi, Louisiana. While Juvenile was recording music at a house there, a neighbor called police to report smelling marijuana. He was cited on a misdemeanor charge of marijuana possession and later released on bond. He pleaded guilty in August 2010 and received a suspended three-month jail sentence and six months of probation and paid a $250 fine and court costs.

In 2017, Juvenile was arrested for failing to pay $170,000 in child support.

Discography

Studio albums 
 Being Myself (1995)
 Solja Rags (1997)
 400 Degreez (1998)
 Tha G-Code (1999)
 Project English (2001)
 600 Degreez (2002)
 Juve the Great (2003)
 Reality Check (2006)
 Cocky & Confident (2009)
 Beast Mode (2010)
 Rejuvenation (2012)
 The Fundamentals (2014)

Collaboration albums 
 Get It How U Live! with Hot Boys (1997)
 Guerrilla Warfare with Hot Boys (1999)
 Baller Blockin' with Cash Money Millionaires (2000)
 Gotta Get It with JT the Bigga Figga (2002)
 Let 'Em Burn with Hot Boys (2003)
 The Beginning of the End with UTP (2004)
 Just Another Gangsta with Birdman (2019)

Filmography 
Baller Blockin' (2000)Juvenile: Uncovered (2001)UTP Live In St. Louis (2002)Hood Angels (2003)Juvenile: Street Heat (2005)New Orleans ExposedTreme (2011)The Power of Few (2013)House Party'' (2023)

References

External links 
 

1975 births
Living people
20th-century American male actors
21st-century American male actors
20th-century American musicians
African-American male actors
African-American male rappers
African-American songwriters
American male film actors
American people convicted of drug offenses
Atlantic Records artists
Cash Money Records artists
Male actors from New Orleans
Rap-A-Lot Records artists
Rappers from New Orleans
Songwriters from Louisiana
21st-century American rappers
20th-century American male musicians
21st-century American male musicians
Universal Records artists
20th-century African-American musicians
21st-century African-American musicians
American male songwriters
Hot Boys members
Cash Money Millionaires members